Nationality words link to articles with information on the nation's poetry or literature (for instance, Irish or France).

Events

Works published
 Robert Crowley, published anonymously, Philargyrie of Greate Britayne; or, The Fable of the Great Giant
 Marcantonio Flaminio, Carmina Sacra, posthumous, Italy

Births
Death years link to the corresponding "[year] in poetry" article:

 Bhai Gurdas (died 1636), Sikh scholar, poet and the scribe of the Adi Granth
 Siméon-Guillaume de La Roque (died 1611), French
 George Whetstone year uncertain (died 1587), English poet and author

Deaths
Birth years link to the corresponding "[year] in poetry" article:
 Ludovico Pasquali (born 1500), Italian author and poet
 Sin Siamdang (born 1504), Korean painter, poet, embroiderer, calligrapher, scholar of Confucian literature and history

See also

 Poetry
 16th century in poetry
 16th century in literature
 Dutch Renaissance and Golden Age literature
 French Renaissance literature
 Renaissance literature
 Spanish Renaissance literature

Notes

16th-century poetry
Poetry